State-owned enterprises (SOEs) in New Zealand are registered companies listed under Schedules 1 and 2 of the State-Owned Enterprises Act 1986. Most SOEs are former government departments or agencies that were corporatised. They are responsible to the Minister of State Owned Enterprises.

Many other government-owned companies and statutory trading organisations are referred to informally as "state-owned enterprises" although they are not SOEs in the strictest sense. These are also listed here.

Function
The function of SOEs is to operate successfully as a business, as profitable as those not owned by the Crown. The section of the Act defining this is usually interpreted as meaning that SOEs are expected to ready themselves for privatisation, though this is not always the case.

Two Ministers of the Crown act as the shareholding ministers in the company. In the case of SOEs these are usually the Minister of State Owned Enterprises (see article for list) and the Minister responsible for the particular company.

The Crown is assisted in the running of SOEs and other Crown-owned companies by the Treasury's Commercial Operations group (formerly the Crown Ownership Monitoring Unit).

List of state enterprises
The state enterprises are listed in Schedule 1 of the State-owned Enterprises Act.

State-(part-)owned enterprises

The following table lists entities that are monitored by Treasury, but are not state enterprises (see table above). For a more complete list of government entities and organisations, see Public sector organisations in New Zealand.

Former state-owned enterprises
Former state-owned enterprises come in three forms – those removed from the Schedules of the Act and made Crown entities, those removed and not privatised, and those removed and privatised. Well-known SOEs that became Crown entity companies include broadcasting companies Television New Zealand (TVNZ) and Radio New Zealand (RNZ).
 Timberlands West Coast Limited, wound up in 2008
 Learning Media Limited, wound up in 2013
 Solid Energy, wound up in 2018

Privatised state-owned enterprises
Privatised state-owned enterprises include:
 Bank of New Zealand (BNZ); sold to National Australia Bank in 1992
 Contact Energy – sold to cornerstone shareholder and sharemarket float in 1999
 DFC New Zealand Limited – went bankrupt in 1989 and later liquidated
 Export Guarantee Office
 Fairway Resolutions
 GCS Limited – formerly Government Computing Services, purchased by EDS New Zealand
 Government Printing Office – became GP Print, Whitcoulls, Blue Star Group and Webstar
 Government Supply Brokerage Corporation (NZ) Limited
 Health Computing Service
 National Film Unit – purchased by Peter Jackson and renamed Park Road Post
 New Zealand Rail Limited (The rail operations of the Railways Corporation) – later renationalised as KiwiRail.
 New Zealand Steel Limited – purchased by BHP
 Post Office Bank Limited (Postbank) – sold to ANZ
 Radio New Zealand (Commercial Stations) – Sold to Clear Channel to form The Radio Network. Non-commercial stations RNZ National and RNZ Concert remain.
 Rural Banking and Finance Corporation – purchased by the National Bank of New Zealand)
 Shipping Corporation of New Zealand – sold to P&O, 1989
 State Insurance Office
 Telecom Corporation of New Zealand Limited – copper network later unbundled between 2006–2008
 Terralink International – GIS provider
 Tourist Hotel Corporation of New Zealand Limited
 Vehicle Testing New Zealand, sold in 1999 to the Motor Trade Association
 Works and Development Services Corporation New Zealand Ltd which remained in state ownership after the sale of Works Civil Construction Ltd to Downer & Company. Company has been struck off Companies Office register on 21 May 2005.

Former, non-SOE state-owned corporations

 State Insurance
 Tourist Hotel Corporation
 Government Life Insurance Corporation – later renamed Tower Insurance
 National Airways Corporation – merged with Air New Zealand in 1980

Other Crown-owned companies
Other, non-SOE Crown-owned companies are the Crown entity companies. These are the Crown Research Institutes (CRIs), the broadcasting companies Television New Zealand Limited (TVNZ) and Radio New Zealand Limited (RNZ), and the New Zealand Venture Investment Fund Limited.

See also

 Constitutional economics
 Council-controlled organisation – a New Zealand local government equivalent
 Crown entity
 List of government-owned companies
 Political economy
 Public sector organisations in New Zealand (lists SOEs and Crown entities)

References

External links and sources
 State-Owned Enterprises Act 1986 as consolidated and amended at the www.legislation.govt.nz site
 Schedule 1 (State Enterprises), State-Owned Enterprises Act 1986 as amended
 Schedule 2 (New State Enterprises), State-Owned Enterprises Act 1986 as amended
 State sector organisations at the State Services Commission site

 
Lists of companies of New Zealand
New Zealand